Lorenzo Benati (born 5 April 2002) is an Italian sprinter, selected to be part of the Italian athletics team for the Tokyo 2020 Olympics, as a possible member of the relay team.

References

External links
 

2002 births
Living people
Italian male sprinters
Athletes from Rome
Athletics competitors of Fiamme Azzurre
Athletes (track and field) at the 2018 Summer Youth Olympics